Sweeck is a surname. Notable people with the surname include:

Alfons Sweeck (1936–2019), Belgian cyclist, grandfather of Diether and Laurens
Diether Sweeck (born 1993), Belgian cyclist, brother of Laurens
Laurens Sweeck (born 1993), Belgian cyclist

See also
 Sweek